Dolichopus sabinus is a species of fly in the family Dolichopodidae. It is found in the  Palearctic .

References

External links
Images representing Dolichopus at BOLD

sabinus
Insects described in 1838
Asilomorph flies of Europe
Taxa named by Alexander Henry Haliday